The 2007–08 Arizona State Sun Devils men's basketball team represented Arizona State University during the 2007–08 NCAA Division I men's basketball season. The Sun Devils played their home games at the Wells Fargo Arena and were members of the Pacific-10 Conference. The Sun Devils finished with 21–13, 9–9 in Pac-10 play. They subsequently lost in the quarter finals to Florida.

Roster

Schedule and results

|-
!colspan=9 style=| Regular Season

|-
!colspan=9 style=| Pac-10 Tournament

|-
!colspan=9 style=| National Invitation Tournament

References

Arizona State Sun Devils men's basketball seasons
2007–08 Pacific-10 Conference men's basketball season
Arizonia
Arizonia
Arizona State